Mount Ida, in Greek mythology, can refer to either of two mountains considered sacred:
 Mount Ida (Crete)
 Mount Ida (Turkey) or Phrygian Ida

Mount Ida may also refer to:

Mountains
 Mount Ida (Antarctica)
 Mount Ida, Tasmania, Australia, first ascended by a party that included Evelyn Temple Emmett
 Mount Ida, Heathcote, Victoria, Australia 
 Mount Ida (Continental Ranges), British Columbia, Canada 
 Mount Ida (Shuswap Highland), British Columbia, Canada
 Mount Ida (Colorado), United States

Places

United States
Mount Ida, Arkansas
Mount Ida (Davenport, Iowa), a neighborhood that borders the Prospect Park Historic District
Mont Ida, Kansas
Mount Ida, Wisconsin, a town
Mount Ida (community), Wisconsin, an unincorporated community in the town
Mount Ida Plantation, a former plantation in Talladega County, Alabama
Mt Ida (Ellicott City, Maryland), a historic home
Mount Ida (Scottsville, Virginia), a historic home

Elsewhere
Mount Ida, Western Australia, an abandoned town
Mount Ida (New Zealand electorate), a community and electorate

Other uses
Mount Ida College, in Newton, Massachusetts
Mount Ida Gold Mine, a gold mine in Western Australia

See also
Ida Ridge, an eroded cinder cone in east-central British Columbia, Canada